Anastrangalia dissimilis is a species of beetle from family Cerambycidae.

Subspecies
 Anastrangalia dissimilis dissimilis (Fairmaire, 1900)
 Anastrangalia dissimilis niitakana (Kano, 1933)

References

Lepturinae
Beetles described in 1891